Line 4 of the Changsha Metro is a rapid transit line in Changsha. It began trial operations without passengers on 29 December  2018. The line opened on 26 May 2019 with 25 stations.

Opening timeline

Stations (Phase 1)

References

Changsha Metro lines
2019 establishments in China
Railway lines opened in 2019